

Seeds
 Roman Jebavý /  Martin Kližan
 Pavel Chekhov /  Petru-Alexandru Luncanu
 Jeevan Nedunchezhiyan /  Sanam Singh
 Philip Bester /  Jonathan Eysseric
 Luka Belić /  Antonio Veić
 Dennis Lajola /  Donald Young
 Michal Konečný /  Andrej Martin
 Ruben Bemelmans /  Jaak Põldma

Draw

Finals

Top half

Bottom half

Boys' Doubles
US Open, 2006 Boys' Doubles